Lampropholis is a genus of skinks, commonly known as sunskinks, in the lizard subfamily Eugongylinae of the family Scincidae. The genus Lampropholis was previously found to belong to a clade with the genera Niveoscincus, Leiolopisma and others of the Eugongylus group within Lygosominae. All species of Lampropholis are endemic to Australia. For similar skinks see genera Bassiana, Pseudemoia, and Niveoscincus.

Diet
Sunskinks feed on invertebrates such as crickets, moths, slaters (woodlice), earthworms, and cockroaches.

Species
The following 14 species are recognized as being valid.
Lampropholis adonis  – diamond-shielded sunskink, Ingram's litter skink
Lampropholis amicula  – friendly sunskink
Lampropholis bellendenkerensis 
Lampropholis caligula  – montane sunskink
Lampropholis coggeri  – northern rainforest sunskink
Lampropholis colossus  – Bunya sunskink
Lampropholis couperi  – plain-backed sunskink
Lampropholis delicata  – delicate skink, rainbow skink, garden skink, delicate grass skink
Lampropholis elliotensis 
Lampropholis elongata  – long sunskink, elongate sunskink
Lampropholis guichenoti  – common garden skink, pale-flecked garden sunskink, grass skink, Guichenot's grass skink
Lampropholis mirabilis  – saxicoline sunskink
Lampropholis robertsi  – grey-bellied sunskink
Lampropholis similis  – southern rainforest sunskink

Nota bene: A binomial authority in parentheses indicates that the species was originally described in a genus other than Lampropholis.

References

Further reading
Fitzinger (1843). Systema Reptilium, Fasciculus Primus, Amblyglossae. Vienna: Braumüller & Seidel. 106 pp. + indices. (Lampropholis, new genus, p. 22). (in Latin).

 
Lizard genera
Taxa named by Leopold Fitzinger